Robert Whetters (born 2 September 1939) is a former Australian racing cyclist. He won the Australian national road race title in 1969. He also competed in the individual road race and team pursuit events at the 1960 Summer Olympics.

Whetters won the professional Goulburn to Sydney Classic in 1973 run in reverse direction from Hoxton Park to Goulburn and twice set the fastest time in 1973 and in 1969 run in reverse direction from Milperra to Goulburn.

References

External links
 

1939 births
Living people
Australian male cyclists
Place of birth missing (living people)
Olympic cyclists of Australia
Cyclists at the 1960 Summer Olympics
Australian track cyclists
20th-century Australian people
21st-century Australian people